Darnell Anthony Furlong (born 31 October 1995) is an English professional footballer who plays as a defender for  club West Bromwich Albion.

Club career

Queens Park Rangers
Having impressed at junior level, Darnell signed his first professional contract with the club in March 2014. Furlong's Premier League and senior debut for Queens Park Rangers came on 21 February 2015 at the age of 19 in the 2–1 defeat against Hull City at The KC Stadium. Furlong was named in the starting line up by Head Coach Chris Ramsey and played the full 90 minutes. Furlong's second senior appearance came on 4 March 2015 for Queens Park Rangers at home to Arsenal, the Hoops lost the game 2–1, with Furlong playing the full 90 minutes.

Northampton Town (loan)
On 11 September 2015, Furlong joined Northampton Town on a month's loan to gain first team experience. The following day, Furlong made his debut in a 1–0 victory over Oxford United, playing the full 90 minutes. Furlong went on to make nine more league appearances for Northampton Town before returning to Queens Park Rangers in November 2015. Northampton later went on to win the League Two title without Furlong.

Cambridge United (loan)
On 5 January 2016, Furlong signed for Cambridge United on a one-month loan deal. On 9 January 2016, Furlong made his Cambridge United debut in a 1–0 away defeat against Crawley Town, playing the full 90 minutes. On 8 February 2016, after impressing within the first month of his loan spell with Cambridge United, Furlong's loan spell at the Abbey Stadium was extended for a further month. On 12 March 2016, Furlong started for Cambridge against Northampton, the team he had been on loan to at the start of the season. The match finished 1–1 with a dramatic late equaliser by Cambridge. On 19 April 2016, Cambridge defeated Morecambe 7–0, with Furlong contributing with an assist. The result matched Cambridge's record of their biggest ever league victory. After numerous loan extensions to Furlong's Cambridge United career, he returned to Queens Park Rangers at the end of the 2015–16 campaign having played for every minute of every league game for Cambridge since his signing.

Swindon Town (loan)
On 12 August 2016, Furlong joined League One side Swindon Town on a season-long loan. A day later, Furlong made his debut in a 3–1 defeat against Chesterfield, in which he netted Swindon's consolation goal in the 88th minute, the first competitive professional goal of his career. On 18 October 2016, Furlong opened the scoring for the Robins in the 24th minute, as Swindon went on to defeat Rochdale 3–0. He was recalled by QPR on 2 January 2017, having started in all but 3 of Swindon's league games, and appearing in all but 1, from the time of his arrival, until his departure.

Return to Queens Park Rangers
After Furlong was recalled from his loan at Swindon, he returned to the starting line up on 12 January 2017 (his first league appearance for the club in almost 2 years) as QPR pulled off an upset against promotion hopefuls Reading, 1–0 away from home, in which Furlong played the full 90 minutes. Under new boss Ian Holloway, Furlong saw a prolonged duration in the side in the form of a right back/right wing back. Shortly after returning from his loan spell, Furlong's sudden involvement with the first team earned him a two-year contract extension until the summer of 2019. On the contract extension, Furlong said "it's a massive boost for me personally and a fresh chance. I've really enjoyed the last few weeks and it's given me a taste of first team football at QPR. I've signed this new deal and I can really focus on kicking on." He scored his first goal for QPR in an EFL Cup tie against Brentford on 22 August 2017.

West Bromwich Albion
On 23 July 2019, Furlong signed for West Bromwich Albion for an undisclosed fee, signing a four-year deal with the club. He scored his first goal for West Brom against Huddersfield Town on 22 September 2019.

Personal life
Furlong is the son of former Chelsea, Watford, Queens Park Rangers and Birmingham City , Luton Town striker Paul Furlong, who is currently an academy coach at QPR.
He is also eligible to play for Montserrat.

Career statistics

References

1995 births
Living people
Footballers from Luton
English footballers
Association football defenders
Queens Park Rangers F.C. players
Northampton Town F.C. players
Cambridge United F.C. players
Swindon Town F.C. players
Premier League players
English Football League players
Black British sportsmen